Pepa Lábus (born 15 December 1968 in Trutnov) is a Czech singer-songwriter. He started his career in 1984 as a folk musician. In 1996, he released the first album Morana as a solo artist and next year, he was joined by violinist Slávek Forman and bassist Tomáš Nýdrle and they performed as a trio under the name Pepa Lábus a Spol. His most recent album Délka vteřiny was released in 2012. He is also lyricist for other artists, such as Luboš Pospíšil. He is also a radio presenter on Radio Beat station.

Discography
Morana (1996)
Zrcadlo Mistra Matyáše (1999)
Bezčasá a nehnutá (2002)
Vzlétají ptáci (2006)
Délka vteřiny (2012)
Uzamčená brána (2022)

References

External links
Official website

1968 births
Living people
20th-century Czech male singers
Czech folk singers
Czech guitarists
Male guitarists
Folk guitarists
21st-century Czech male singers